Triglia Football Club is a Greek professional football club based in Triglia, Chalkidiki, Greece.

Honours

Domestic

League titles 
 Chalkidiki FCA Championship (Local Championship)
 Winners (6): 1982–83, 1987–88, 1990–91, 2001–02, 2003–04, 2017–18

Cups 
Chalkidiki FCA Cup (Local Cup)
 Winners (9): 1981–82, 1984–85, 1986–87, 1987–88, 1988–89, 1991–92, 2003–04, 2016–17, 2018–19

References 

 
Football clubs in Central Macedonia
Chalkidiki
Association football clubs established in 1952
1952 establishments in Greece